Playaz N the Game is the second solo full-length album by American rapper and producer JT the Bigga Figga from San Francisco. It was released on July 13, 1993 through Get Low Recordz, making it the debut for both JT and the indie label. The album features guest appearances from D-Moe, Gigolo G, Mac Mall, Rappin' 4-Tay and San Quinn.

The album was not a commercial success when it first came out, but today the album is considered as a classic. Playaz N the Game only managed to make it #91 on the Top R&B/Hip-Hop Albums and the two singles released, "Peep Game" and "Game Recognize Game" did not make it to the charts, but the latter received frequent airplay on local hip-hop station Wild 107.7.

It was reissued via Get Low Recordz in 1996 with distribution by Priority Records and in 2006 via with distribution by SMC Recordings.

Track listing

Sample credits
Game Recognize Game
"I'm So Into You" by SWV

Charts

References

External links

1993 albums
JT the Bigga Figga albums